The dorsal ramus of spinal nerve (or posterior ramus of spinal nerve, or posterior primary division) is the posterior division of a spinal nerve. The dorsal ramus (Latin for branch, plural rami ) is the dorsal branch of a spinal nerve that forms from the dorsal root of the nerve after it emerges from the spinal cord. The spinal nerve is formed from the dorsal and ventral rami. The dorsal ramus carries information that supplies muscles and skin sensation to the human back.

Structure
Ventral root axons join with dorsal root ganglia to form mixed spinal nerves (below). These then merge to form peripheral nerves.  Shortly after this spinal nerve forms, it then branches into the dorsal ramus and ventral ramus. Spinal nerves are mixed nerves that carry both sensory and motor information. It also branches to form the grey and the white rami communicantes which make connections with the sympathetic ganglia.

After it is formed, the dorsal ramus of each spinal nerve travels backward, except for the first cervical, the fourth and fifth sacral, and the coccygeal. Dorsal rami divide into medial, intermediate, and lateral branches.  The lateral branch supplies innervation to the iliocostalis muscle, as well as the skin lateral to the muscle on the back.  The Intermediate branch supplies innervation to the spinalis muscle and the longissimus muscle.  The medial branch supplies innervation to the rest of the epaxial derived muscles on the back (including the transversospinales, intertransversarii muscles, interspinalis muscles, suboccipital muscles, and splenius), and the zygapophyseal joints.

Function
Because each spinal nerve carries both sensory and motor information, spinal nerves are referred to as mixed nerves. Posterior rami carry visceral motor, somatic motor, and sensory information to and from the skin and deep muscles of the back. The posterior rami remain distinct from each other, and each innervates a narrow strip of skin and muscle along the back, more or less at the level from which the ramus leaves the spinal nerve.

References

Additional images

External links
 

Spinal nerves